Eugene Prussing was a Chicago-based Hollywood lawyer and philanthropist. Prussing was born to activist parents in 1885. His father, German immigrant Ernst Prussing, was an advocate for abolitionism and the Underground Railroad. Additionally, he served on the Chicago Board of Education and founded several organizations for the betterment of Chicago's German immigrants. While raising his family of seven children, Prussing practiced law in Evanston, Illinois. Upon the death of his first wife, Louise, in 1900, he remarried Lillian Barrett and spent six months each year in Hollywood. Prussing had a lasting impact on Chicago, however, as he established several law-related clubs at the Union League Club, including the Law Club and the Judges' Table. He also wrote historical non-fiction about George Washington, Chicago legal history and important legal cases.

References

External Links 
 Eugene Prussing Papers at Newberry Library

1885 births
Year of death missing
American lawyers
American philanthropists
American people of German descent
Members of the Chicago Board of Education